Connard is a surname. Notable people with the surname include:

 Geoffrey Connard (1925–2013), Australian politician
 Leo Connard (1860–after 1928), Austrian actor
 Philip Connard (1875–1958), British artist

See also
 Connare